Pardaleodes tibullus, the large pathfinder skipper, is a butterfly in the family Hesperiidae. It is found in Guinea, Sierra Leone, Liberia, Ivory Coast, Ghana, Togo, Nigeria, Cameroon, Gabon, the Republic of the Congo, the Central African Republic, Angola, the Democratic Republic of the Congo, Sudan, Uganda and Kenya. The habitat consists of open areas in forests.

Adults are attracted to flowers, particularly those of the families Acanthaceae and Lamiaceae.

The larvae feed on Pennisetum species.

Subspecies
Pardaleodes tibullus tibullus (Guinea, Sierra Leone, Liberia, Ivory Coast, Ghana, Togo, Nigeria, Cameroon, Gabon, Congo, Central African Republic, Angola, Democratic Republic of the Congo, southern Sudan)
Pardaleodes tibullus torensis Bethune-Baker, 1906 (Uganda, western Kenya)

References

Butterflies described in 1793
Erionotini